Al Ray Alaam was a Kuwaiti Arabic-language daily newspaper that ceased publication in 1995.

History and operations
The newspaper was launched by Abdulaziz Al Massaeed on 16 April 1961 as a weekly with the name of Al Rai Aam. Al Masaeed was both the owner and the publisher of the newspaper that was initially published in Beirut, Lebanon. Later it was relaunched as a daily based in Kuwait. The newspaper license was rented to Jassim Al Boodai and in 1995, and it was re-published as Al Rai in 2006 after the new press law and under new ownership.

See also

 List of Arab newspapers
 List of newspapers in Kuwait
 List of newspapers in Lebanon

References

External links
, the newspaper's official website (in Arabic)

1961 establishments in Lebanon
Arabic-language newspapers
Daily newspapers published in Lebanon
Newspapers published in Beirut
Newspapers published in Kuwait
Publications established in 1961
Weekly newspapers published in Lebanon